Dianne Stewart or Diane Stewart may refer to:

 Dianne Stewart (author) (born 1952), South African author
 Dianne M. Stewart, Jamaican-born American professor
 Diane Purdie Stewart (also known as Alexandra Quinn; born 1973), Canadian former pornographic actress